Plumes is a one-act, folk drama written by Georgia Douglas Johnson in 1927 (first produced at Chicago's Cube Theatre in the same year). It was played at the Harlem Experimental Theatre between the years of 1928 and 1931. This play won first prize in a playwriting contest sponsored by the influential opportunity magazine.

This play was written during the Harlem Renaissance, which was a literary movement based around African-American literature and art. During this time, lynching plays were created as African-Americans expressed the devastation brought on their families because of lynching, which was a common practice in the south. Johnson was one of the most famous writers during this time and much of her work focused on lynching plays and the hardships many African-Americans faced during their lifetime. Plumes falls into this category and is one of the very few works of Johnson that survived after her death.

Setting 
Plumes takes place in the kitchen of a two-room cottage. There is a window looking out to the street, a door that leads to the street, and another door that leads to the other room. It is dressed with a rocking chair, a cane bottom chair, a stove, a table (with sewing supplies on it), and a wash tub.

The scene opens with Charity Brown cooking in the kitchen.

Characters 
Charity Brown: The Mother

Emmerline Brown: The daughter (this character is only a voice heard from offstage)

Tildy: Charity's friend

Dr. Scott: A physician

Plot Synopsis 
The scene opens on Charity Brown cooking poultice in the kitchen. We can hear groans coming from the other room. Her friend, Tildy, enters the kitchen. They discuss the poultice, hemming a dress in order to make money, and Charity’s ill child in the next room. After going to check on Emmerline, she returns to the kitchen and resumes talking with Tildy. Charity tells Tildy that the last time the doctor visited, he said that Emmerline would need surgery to live. The women do not believe in medical care and are convinced that doctors will only take your money. We find out in this conversation that there were two other children, assumed to be children of Charity, who died and did not receive the extravagant funeral that she had hoped to be able to afford for them. Charity washes clothes for a living, earning $1.50, and saving every penny in order to pay for her daughter’s doctor.

After a cup of coffee back in the kitchen, Tildy reads Charity’s coffee grounds where she predicts a vision of what is in store for Charity’s future. They are interrupted by church bells as a funeral parade walks by their house on the way to the grave yard.

Doctor Scott comes to the house to check on Emmerline. He doesn’t allow Charity to come into the room with him while he checks on her heart and current condition. While he is in there, all she panics while wondering if he will come back to say that her daughter needs to have surgery, which she cannot easily afford. To her dismay, the doctor comes back to reveal that the operation is Emmerline’s last chance at survival, and that he will perform the surgery at a discount. The doctor exits allowing Charity to decide whether or not Emmerline should have this operation.

Both women sit in silence in the kitchen before hearing a strangling noise coming from Emmerline in the other room. They both rush to her, Tildy carrying the white dress for her before going to get a water pitcher. Before she can exit the kitchen Charity comes back, stops in the door way and tells Tildy to rip out the hem on the dress.

Publication 
1927 
 Opportunity Magazine
 Alain Locke's Anthology plays of Negro Life
1928
 An acting edition by Samuel French
1929
 V.F. Calvertok's Anthology of American Literature

References

American plays
Works by Georgia Douglas Johnson